Doryopteris is a genus of ferns in the subfamily Cheilanthoideae of the family Pteridaceae.

Species
The circumscription of the genus was uncertain . The Checklist of Ferns and Lycophytes of the World lists species in three groups.

1. Doryopteris s.s. – species and hybrids assigned to the genus in molecular phylogenetic studies:

Doryopteris adornata Yesilyurt
Doryopteris angelica K.Wood & W.H.Wagner
Doryopteris collina (Raddi) J.Sm.
Doryopteris concolor (Langsd. & Fisch.) Kuhn
Doryopteris decipiens (Hook.) J.Sm.
Doryopteris decora Brack.
Doryopteris × excisa Sehnem
Doryopteris × hybrida Brade & Rosenst.
Doryopteris × intermedia Sehnem
Doryopteris kirkii (Hook.) Alston
Doryopteris leitei Tryon
Doryopteris lonchophora (Mett.) J.Sm.
Doryopteris lorentzii (Hieron.) Diels
Doryopteris majestosa Yesilyurt
Doryopteris nobilis (Moore) J.Sm.
Doryopteris palmata (Willd.) J.Sm.
Doryopteris patula (Fée) Fée
Doryopteris pedata (L.) Fée
Doryopteris pentagona Pic. Serm.
Doryopteris × procera Sehnem
Doryopteris raddiana (Raddi) Fée
Doryopteris rediviva Fée
Doryopteris sagittifolia (Raddi) J.Sm.
Doryopteris × scalaris Sehnem
Doryopteris stierii Rosenst.
Doryopteris × subdecipiens W.H.Wagner
Doryopteris surinamensis Yesilyurt
Doryopteris takeuchii (W.H.Wagner) W.H.Wagner
Doryopteris triphylla (Lam.) Christ
Doryopteris varians (Raddi) J.Sm.

2. Additional species belonging to Doryopteris s.l. – placed outside of Doryopteris s. str. by Yesilyurt et al. (2015), but with no alternative placement:
Doryopteris angustata Sehnem
Doryopteris apparicioi Brade
Doryopteris campos-portoi Brade
Doryopteris conformis Kramer & Tryon
Doryopteris crispatula (Baker) C.Chr.
Doryopteris cyclophylla A.R.Sm.
Doryopteris davidsei A.R.Sm.
Doryopteris jequitinhonhensis Salino
Doryopteris trilobata J.Prado

3. Species placed outside of Doryopteris s.s. by Yesilyurt et al. (2015) that may be part of a redescribed Pellaeopsis or Hemionitis:
Doryopteris cordifolia (Baker) Diels
Doryopteris humbertii Tardieu
Doryopteris kitchingii (Baker) Bonap.
Doryopteris latiloba C.Chr.
Doryopteris madagascariensis Tardieu
Doryopteris pedatoides (Desv.) Kuhn
Doryopteris pilosa (Poir.) Kuhn

References

 
Fern genera